The Roman Catholic Archdiocese of Veszprém is an archdiocese of the Latin Church of the Roman Catholic Church  in Hungary. Believed to have been established in 1009 AD by King Stephen I of Hungary, as the Diocese of Veszprém, the diocese was originally a suffragan to the Archdiocese of Esztergom. In 1992, the Diocese was elevated to an Archdiocese.  The Archdiocese is the Metropolitan of the Diocese of Kaposvár and the Diocese of Szombathely.

The Cathedral of Veszprém is dedicated to Saint Michael. The current archbishop is György Udvardy, formerly Bishop of Pecs, who was appointed by Pope Francis on July 12, 2019, to succeed the retiring Gyula Márfi.

Establishment of the diocese
The circumstances of the establishment of the episcopal see in Veszprém are still under debate. It is probable that Veszprém was the habitual residence of Bishop Bruno, who had been sent to evangelise the Magyars in 972; but it was probably only in 1009 when King Stephen I of Hungary issued the Deed of Foundation of the Diocese of Veszprém. Based on the Deed of Foundation, the territory of the Diocese of Veszprém extended over the territories of the Counties of Veszprém, Fejér, Visegrád and Kolon. The Diocese of Veszprém was suffragan to the Archdiocese of Esztergom.

When the Abbey of Pannonhalma was established in 1001, King Stephen I granted the tithes of the County of Somogy to the Abbey, but the county itself still belonged to the Diocese of Veszprém.

The diocese was linked traditionally to the queen consort. Thus, the ius patronatus of the Cathedral in Veszprém was due to not only the king of Hungary but also his wife.

11th–14th centuries
Based on the tradition, the bishop of Veszprém was entitled to crown queens of Hungary, and this tradition was confirmed by an agreement between Bishop Robert of Veszprém and Archbishop János of Esztergom in April 1216.

The bishop of Veszprém became also the queen's chancellor. The first bishop of Veszprém who used the title was Bertalan, Bishop of Veszprém, and in 1269 King Béla IV confirmed that the title was connected to the bishopric.

In the year 1294, Queen Fenenna confirmed that, at that time, Dowager Queen Elizabeth had the privilege to collect the donations of the church in the Veszprém County, despite being a former queen.

On 26 October 1313, King Charles I and Bishop Stephen Kéki concluded an agreement under which the Bishop ceded the tithe of Csepel Island to the King in exchange for the County of Veszprém. The agreement was confirmed, in 1392, by King Sigismund; therefore the bishops of Veszprém became also the perpetual ispáns  of Veszprém.

List of the Bishops and Archbishops of Veszprém
Stephen (c. 1009)
Modestus (or Buldi; c. 1046)
Nicholas (or Clement; c. 1055)
George (c. 1061)
Andrew (c. 1062–1081)
John I (c. 1082)
Cosmas (1087–1090)
Almarius (c. 1091)
Matthew (1111–1117)
Nana (1121–1131)
Martyrius (before 1135)
Peter I (1135–1138)
Paul (c. 1142)
Peta (c. 1156)
Benedict II (c. 1171)
John II (1181–1193)
Calanda (1199–1209)
Robert (1209–1225)
Bartholomew (1226–1243)
Zlaudus (1245–1262)
Paul II (1263–1275)
Peter II Kőszegi (1275–1289)
Benedict II (1290–1309)
Stephen II Kéki (1310–1322)
Henry (1323–1333)
Duke Mieszko Piast (1335–1343)
Stephen III Büki (1344–1345)
Galhard de Carceribus (1345–1346)
John III Garai (1347–1357)
Ladislaus I Zsámboki (1358–1371)
Ladislaus II Deméndi (1373–1377)
Peter III Siklósi (1378)
Benedict III Himházi (1379–1387)
Demetrius I Vajdai (1387–1392)
 Pietro Isvalies (1503–1511)
 Petar Berislavić/Péter Beriszló (1512–1520)
 Pavol Várdai (1521–1523)
Thomas Szalaházy (1524–1526)
Martin I Kecseti (1528–1548)
Paul III Bornemissza (1549–1553)
Andrew I Köves (1553–1568)
Stephen IV Fejérkövy (1573–1587)
Francis I Forgách (1587–1596)
Andrew II Monoszloy (1596–1601)
Louis Újlaky (1603–1605)
Demetrius II Napragy (1605–1606)
Valentin Lépes (1608)
Peter IV Radovith (1608)
Francis II Erghely (1608–1628)
Stephen V Kissennyei-Sennyey (1628–1630)
Stephen VI Csíkmádéfalvi-Szentandrásy (1630)
Paul IV David (1630–1633)
George I Lippay (1633–1637)
George II Orlovai-Jakusyth (1637–1642)
Stephen VII Magyarbéli-Bosnyák (1642–1644)
George III Szelepcsény (1644–1648)
George IV Széchényi (1648–1658)
Paul V Hoffmann (1658–1659)
Stephen VII Kissennyei-Sennyey (1659–1683)
Paul VI Széchényi (1687–1710)
Otto Jochannes Volkra von Heidenreichstein (1710–1720)
Count Emeric Esterházy (1723–1725)
Adam Acsády (1725–1744)
Martin II Padányi-Bíró (1745–1762)
Ignatius Nagymányai-Koller (1762–1773)
John IV Bajzáth (1777–1802)
Paul VI Rosos (1808–1809)
George V Kurbély (1809–1821)
Anton Makay (1823–1825)
John V Kopácsy (1825–1847)
Count Dominic Zichy (1847–1849)
John VI Ranolder (1849–1875)
Sigismund Kovács (1877–1887)
Baron Charles Hornig (1888–1917)
Nándor Rott (1917–1939)
Tihamér Tóth (1939)
Gyula Czapik (1939–1943)
József Mindszenty (1943–1945)
Ladislaus Bánáss (1946–1949)
Bartholomew Alexander Badalik (1949–1965)
Ladislaus Kádár (1975–1978)
Ladislaus Paskai (1979–1982)
József Szendi (1983–1997)
Gyula Márfi (1997–2019)
György Udvardy (since 2019)

Sources 
 Balogh, Margit - Gergely, Jenő: Egyházak az újkori Magyarországon (1790-1992) - Adattár (MTA Történettudományi Intézete, Budapest, 1996)
 Korai Magyar Történeti Lexikon (9-14. század), főszerkesztő: Kristó, Gyula, szerkesztők: Engel, Pál és Makk, Ferenc (Akadémiai Kiadó, Budapest, 1994)
 Fallenbüchl, Zoltán: Magyarország főispánjai 1526-1848 (Argumentum, Budapest, 1994)
 Magyarország Történeti Kronológiája I-III. – A kezdetektől 1526-ig; 1526-1848, 1848-1944, főszerkesztő: Benda, Kálmán (Akadémiai Kiadó, Budapest, 1981, 1982, 1993)
 Magyar Történelmi Fogalomtár I-II. – A-K; L-ZS, főszerkesztő: Bán, Péter (Gondolat, Budapest, 1989)
 Fallenbüchl, Zoltán: Magyarország főméltóságai (Maecenas, 1988)
 Karácsonyi, János: Magyarország egyháztörténete főbb vonásaiban 970-től 1900-ig (Könyvértékesítő Vállalat, Budapest, 1985)

References

http://www.catholic-hierarchy.org/diocese/dvesz.html

History of Christianity in Hungary
Veszprem
 
Veszprem
1009 establishments in Europe
People from Veszprém